Jukebox is the eleventh studio album by Australian pop vocal group Human Nature released in October 2014. 
It contains covers from the 1950s and 1960s, with one original song, "End of Days"

Group member Andrew Tierney said of 'End of Days'; "It's really become a highlight on the record. It goes back to those soul ballads, and it's also got a contemporary edge to it because it's a new song. It's such a thrill to have our own song alongside these classics and part of our own Jukebox."

Background
Following the success of The Christmas Album, Human Nature returned to the studio to record a new album; this time, an album of  covers from the 1950s and 60's. In 1989, the first song Human Nature ever sang together was Earth Angel by The Penguins. 
Group member Toby Allen said; "For us…the 'Jukebox' record is kind of going back to our roots and revisiting it…that classic doo-wop stuff was what we did when we got together." He continued, "We've developed enough over the years that we can go back to the past in a confident manner."

The album will be supported by a national tour in April/May 2015.

Promotion 
Human Nature performed Earth Angel live on Sunrise on September 1.

Human Nature performed "Will You Love Me Tomorrow" and "Runaound Sue" live on Dancing with the Stars on October 28.

Human Nature released a music video for Runaround Sue on October 10  and Will You Love Me Tomorrow on October 17  via their VEVO account.

Track listing

Critical reception 
A writer from smoothfm described Jukebox as a "brilliant collection" and that Human Nature "takes a trip back to the glory days of popular music". Kirsten Maree from Renowned For Sound gave the album four out of five stars. She also praised the group's vocals, saying "what I love most about Andrew, Michael, Toby and Phil is their unwavering dedication not to out-do the classics, but pay tribute to them. This kind of project in anyone else's hands may not be worth it, but with Human Nature, we have a winner."

Tour 

In October 2014, Human Nature announced a 5-date Australian tour, commencing in Perth on April 28, 2015 An additional Sydney show was added in November.

Charts

Weekly charts

Year-end charts

Certifications

See also
 List of top 25 albums for 2014 in Australia

References

2014 albums
Covers albums
Sony Music Australia albums
Human Nature (band) albums